Aleksandar Vasiljević is a Serbian retired major general and the head of the Counterintelligence Service of Yugoslavia. Vasiljević was instrumental in the JBTZ-trial as he was the interrogation official responsible to talking with Janez Janša which was centered on Slovene dissidents and publishing of sensitive information in the youth magazine Mladina. Vasiljević retired in May 1992 and was arrested for his role in an interview with the weekly publication NIN. He was again deputy head between March 1999 and 2001. He testified in the Hague trial against Slobodan Milosevic.

See also
JBTZ-trial

References
Affairs in the army, The Purge Continues
Analysis: The men Milosevic fears
The Trouble With Insiders II: Aleksandar Vasiljević

Living people
Serbian generals
1938 births